Justiceburg is an unincorporated community in Garza County, Texas, United States.

Geography
Justiceburg is located at  (33.042072, -101.202992), in southeastern Garza County.

History
Justiceburg is located around the site of a town originally known as LeForrest (variously spelled Le Forest) and had a post office of that name from 1902 until 1905.

In 1910, a rancher named Jefferson Davis Justice then bought the land, and granted the Atchison, Topeka and Santa Fe Railroad right of way. LeForrest became Justiceburg in honor of this development; the railroad was then completed in 1911.

Justiceburg has remained a small village throughout its history, with the population fluctuating between 25 and 76; in the 1980s, many of these residents were reportedly descendants of Jefferson Davis Justice. At one time, many thought the town of Justiceburg would become a regional hub for commerce. While this never materialized, some still maintain this vision that someday Justiceburg will become the next boomtown, including local folk-hero meteorologist John Robison from Lubbock TV station KCBD.

The town once had a functioning schoolhouse and railroad depot; these have since been abandoned, as have several homes. The area of town to the east of U.S. Route 84 contains the town's church; the area to the west has most of the buildings, inhabited or otherwise.

Justiceburg has been featured in the book "More Ghost Towns of Texas" by T. Lindsay Baker. The dereliction of many of the buildings gives Justiceburg a ghost town feel, despite the fact that some still live there.

 Former Major League Baseball player Norm Cash was born in Justiceburg.

Demographics
The population of the ZIP code area (79330) around Justiceburg in the 2000 census was 60.

Economy
As of 1997, there was one retail operation and no manufacturing concerns in the area bound by the local zip code.

The railroad, now part of the BNSF network, still runs through Justiceburg.

Gallery

See also
Caprock Escarpment
Close City, Texas
Llano Estacado
Southland, Texas
West Texas

References

External links

Unincorporated communities in Garza County, Texas
Ghost towns in the Texas South Plains
Unincorporated communities in Texas